Igor Borisovich Chubais (born 26 April 1947, Berlin, Soviet occupation zone of Germany) is a  Russian philosopher and sociologist, Doctor of Sciences, and the author of many scientific and journalistic works. He is an initiator of the introduction of the Russian education system a new subject Russian studies. He is the first dean of "Russian studies" department at the Institute of Social Sciences and the director of Inter-University center for Russian studies in the faculty of Humanities and Social Sciences at the Peoples' Friendship University of Russia. He is a board member of the Russian Writers Union.

He is the older brother of Russian billionaire oligarch and politician Anatoly Chubais. The two have starkly different politics, and do not communicate with one another.

In 2010 he signed a petition of the opposition political advocacy campaign "Putin must go," and in September 2014 signed a statement demanding an end to the Russo-Ukrainian War, the annexation of Crimea by the Russian Federation and the Russian military support to separatists in Eastern Ukraine.

In the 2018 Russian presidential election, he was a confidant of Grigory Yavlinsky.

References

External links
  Краткая биография Игоря Чубайса, переводы публикаций в зарубежных СМИ
Rozmowa o polityce Rosji
 Биография

1947 births
Living people
People from East Berlin
Russian people of Lithuanian-Jewish descent
21st-century Russian philosophers
Russian radio personalities
Russian studies scholars
Saint Petersburg State University alumni
Expelled members of the Communist Party of the Soviet Union
20th-century Russian Jews
Russian sociologists
Jewish sociologists
Jewish philosophers
20th-century Russian philosophers